Gastroptychus is a genus of squat lobsters in the family Chirostylidae, containing the following species:

 Gastroptychus affinis (Chace, 1942)
 Gastroptychus brachyterus Baba, 2005
 Gastroptychus brevipropodus Baba, 1991
 Gastroptychus cavimurus Baba, 1977
 Gastroptychus defensus (Benedict, 1902)
 Gastroptychus formosus (Filhol, 1884)
 Gastroptychus hawaiiensis Baba, 1977
 Gastroptychus hendersoni (Alcock & Anderson, 1899)
 Gastroptychus iaspis Baba & Haig, 1990
 Gastroptychus investigatoris (Alcock & Anderson, 1899)
 Gastroptychus laevis (Henderson, 1885)
 Gastroptychus meridionalis de Melo-Filho & de Melo, 2004
 Gastroptychus milneedwardsi (Henderson, 1885).
 Gastroptychus novaezelandiae Baba, 1974
 Gastroptychus paucispina Baba, 1991
 Gastroptychus perarmatus (Haig, 1968)
 Gastroptychus rogeri Baba, 2000
 Gastroptychus salvadori Rice & Miller, 1991
 Gastroptychus spinifer (A. Milne Edwards, 1880)
 Gastroptychus sternoornatus (Van Dam, 1933)
 Gastroptychus valdiviae (Balss, 1913)

References

Squat lobsters